Never Mind 2021 was a professional wrestling event promoted by CyberFight's sub-brand DDT Pro-Wrestling (DDT). It took place on December 26, 2021, in Tokyo, Japan, at the Yoyogi National Gymnasium. The event aired on CyberAgent's AbemaTV online linear television service and CyberFight's streaming service Wrestle Universe. It was the eighteenth event in the Never Mind series.

Production

Background
Since 2001, DDT began producing their year-end shows under the branch of "Never Mind". The events' traditional venue was initially the Korakuen Hall, but during the years, the promotion moved the events to other arenas. These events conclude certain feuds and rivalries built during the year. Between 2017 and 2021, the Never Mind series were briefly replaced by the DDT Ultimate Party as the promotion's year-closing events.

Storylines
The event featured eleven professional wrestling matches that resulted from scripted storylines, where wrestlers portrayed villains, heroes, or less distinguishable characters in the scripted events that built tension and culminated in a wrestling match or series of matches.

Event
The show portraited three title matches, with all of them coming off with the champions retaining their respective titles. The first one saw Damnation T.A.'s leader Daisuke Sasaki scoring the third defense of the DDT Universal Championship against Masahiro Takanashi. Next, the team of Harashima and Naomi Yoshimura securing their first defense of the KO-D Tag Team Championship against The Bodyguard and Yuji Hino. The main event portraited the confrontation between Konosuke Takeshita and Big Japan Pro Wrestling's Yuji Okabayashi which solded with the victory of The 37Kamiina's leader who scored the second defense of the KO-D Openweight Championship.

Results

References

External links
The official DDT Pro-Wrestling website

DDT Pro-Wrestling shows
CyberAgent
2021 in professional wrestling
December 2021 events in Japan
Professional wrestling in Tokyo